Andrea Mayr (born October 15, 1979) is a female long-distance runner from Austria. She also competes in mountain running and cycling. She set her personal best (2:30:43) in the women's marathon on April 19, 2009, winning the Vienna City Marathon. She holds the Austrian records over the half marathon and marathon distances.

Biography
She represented Austria in the 3000 metres steeplechase at both the 2005 and 2007 World Championships in Athletics, although she did not make it past the heats. She won the event in the Second League section of the 2008 European Cup and managed a silver for Austria in the Second League of the 2010 European Team Championships.

Mayr set a course record at the 2008 Obudu Ranch International Mountain Race in Nigeria. She won the World Mountain Running Championships in 2010, beating runner-up Valentina Belotti by over half a minute in the 8.5 km race. She also won the WMRA Grand Prix series that year: she had already secured the title before the final by merit of having an unassailable lead in the points table, yet she went on to win the Smarna Gora race finale and further cement her position as the world's top female mountain runner. She is the record holder of the Empire State Building Run-Up (11:23, 2006).  She has six World Mountain Running titles.

Mayr competed in the 2012 London Olympics for Austria. She finished 54th in the women's marathon.

Achievements

References

External links

1979 births
Living people
Austrian female long-distance runners
Austrian female marathon runners
Austrian female steeplechase runners
Duathletes
Austrian female cyclists
Austrian mountain runners
People from Wels
Athletes (track and field) at the 2012 Summer Olympics
Athletes (track and field) at the 2016 Summer Olympics
Olympic athletes of Austria
Tower runners
World Mountain Running Championships winners
Sportspeople from Upper Austria
21st-century Austrian women